Nils Seufert (born 3 February 1997) is a German professional footballer who plays as a midfielder for  club Greuther Fürth.

Career
Seufert made his professional debut for 1. FC Kaiserslautern on 25 October 2017, starting in a home match in the second round of the 2017–18 DFB-Pokal against Bundesliga club VfB Stuttgart.

In May 2021 SpVgg Greuther Fürth, newly promoted to the Bundesliga, announced the signing of Seufert for the 2021–22 season. He signed a contract until 2024 and joined on a free transfer from Arminia Bielefeld.

On 1 January 2022, Seufert was loaned to SV Sandhausen until the end of the season.

References

External links
 

1997 births
Living people
Footballers from Mannheim
German footballers
Association football midfielders
1. FC Kaiserslautern II players
1. FC Kaiserslautern players
Arminia Bielefeld players
SpVgg Greuther Fürth players
SV Sandhausen players
Regionalliga players
2. Bundesliga players
Bundesliga players